Wahb ibn Saʿd ibn Abī Sarḥ (died in the year 8 AH (629 CE) was a companion of the Islamic prophet Muhammad. He embraced Islam and then moved to Yathrib, and visited the house of Kulthum ibn al-Hidam. He was brothers by the Prophet Muhammad with Suwayd ibn Amr. Musa ibn Uqba, Al-Waqidi and Abu Ma'shar al-Balkhi mentioned it about those who witnessed the Battle of Badr, and Ibn Ishaq did not mention it. Wahb also witnessed the Battle of Uhud, the Battle of the Trench, the Battle of Khaybar, and Treaty of Hudaybiyyah, and was killed in the Battle of Mu'tah in Jumada al-awwal in 8 AH, at the age of 40 years. Wahb ibn Sa'd is the brother of Abdallah ibn Sa'd, whose mother is Muhana bint Jabir al-Ash'ariyyah.

References 

Companions of the Prophet
589 births
629 deaths